Pirkko Sisko Määttä (born 7 March 1959) is a Finnish former cross-country skier who was born in Kuusamo and competed from 1982 to 1995. She won two 4 × 5 km relay bronze medals (1984, 1988) at the Winter Olympics.

Määttä won a complete set of medals at the 1989 FIS Nordic World Ski Championships with a gold in the 4 × 5 km relay, a silver in the 10 km classical, and a bronze in the 15 km. She earned her only individual victory at a 1992 event in Norway.

Cross-country skiing results
All results are sourced from the International Ski Federation (FIS).

Olympic Games
 2 medals – (2 bronze)

World Championships
 3 medals – (1 gold, 1 silver, 1 bronze)

World Cup

Season standings

Individual podiums

3 podiums

Team podiums

 1 victory
 11 podiums

Note:   Until the 1999 World Championships and the 1994 Olympics, World Championship and Olympic races were included in the World Cup scoring system.

References

External links
 
 
 

1959 births
Living people
People from Kuusamo
Finnish female cross-country skiers
Cross-country skiers at the 1984 Winter Olympics
Cross-country skiers at the 1988 Winter Olympics
Cross-country skiers at the 1992 Winter Olympics
Cross-country skiers at the 1994 Winter Olympics
Olympic medalists in cross-country skiing
FIS Nordic World Ski Championships medalists in cross-country skiing
Medalists at the 1984 Winter Olympics
Medalists at the 1988 Winter Olympics
Olympic bronze medalists for Finland
Sportspeople from North Ostrobothnia